The Third Degree is a 1919 American silent crime drama directed by Tom Terriss produced and distributed by the Vitagraph Company of America. It is based on the 1909 play of the same name by Charles Klein.

Filmed several times throughout the silent era, this version starred Alice Joyce with actress/gossip columnist Hedda Hopper in a supporting role and was the next to last silent version of the play, the last being released in 1926 starring Dolores Costello. The Third Degree is now considered to be a lost film.

Plot
As described in a film magazine, Howard Jeffries, Sr. (Randolf) marries again, and the film reveals that the new Mrs. Howard Jeffries, Sr. (Hopper) and Robert Underwood (Evans), the rather fast college roommate of Howard Jeffries, Jr. (James), had been more than just friends. Howard Jr. marries Annie Sands (Joyce), who had been a lovely waitress in the college town. When the father hears who the bride is, there is a flare up and the young couple leaves the house. Underwood opens a curio store, but loses money that does not belong to him. He writes to Mrs. Jeffries, Sr. and says that if she does not come to him, he will shoot himself. Howard Jr. remembers that Underwood owes him some money and goes to collect it, but there gets drunk and passes out on the sofa. Underwood hides him, and Mrs. Jeffries, Sr. arrives and tells Underwood that she will have nothing to do with him. After she leaves, Underwood shoots and kills himself. This sound awakes Howard Jr., who is captured by the police and, under the hypnotic strain of the third degree, confesses to murder. When it is learned that a young woman had called on Underwood, the police try to pin the crime on Annie. She suspects that it was the other Mrs. Jeffries, and gets her to provide evidence to show that it was a suicide, but, to protect her fellow relative, Annie allows the police to believe that she had made the visit. After the trial, Howard, Sr. still wants to end his son's marriage on the sly, but a lawyer who is a family friend convinces Mrs. Jeffries, Sr. to confess to her husband, and the family conflicts are resolved.

Cast
 Alice Joyce – Annie Sands
 Gladden James –  Howard Jeffries, Jr.
 Anders Randolf – Howard Jeffries, Sr.
 Hedda Hopper – Mrs. Howard Jeffries, Sr.
 Herbert Evans – Robert Underwood
 George Backus – Richard Brewster
 John P. Wade – Dr. Thompson
 L. Rogers Lytton – Captain Clinton
 Edward McGuire – Sergeant Maloney
 Alfred Fisher

References

External links

 
 
The Third Degree small poster
Lantern slide
large poster

1919 films
1919 crime drama films
1919 romantic drama films
American crime drama films
American romantic drama films
American silent feature films
American black-and-white films
American films based on plays
Lost American films
Vitagraph Studios films
1919 lost films
Lost romantic drama films
Films directed by Tom Terriss
1910s American films
Silent romantic drama films
Silent American drama films
1910s English-language films